Rolling Road station is a Virginia Railway Express station in Burke, Virginia. The station is served by the Virginia Railway Express Manassas Line on weekdays, except for two inbound and one outbound train each day. VRE shares the right-of-way with Amtrak's Cardinal and Crescent trains; however, no Amtrak trains stop here.

The station platform will be expanded an extra .  The existing platform can only accommodate five car trains.  Long trains are unable to open all doors during boarding.  A contractor was selected for this work in October 2020 and work began in early 2021.

Station layout

References

External links 
Rolling Road VRE Station
 Station from Google Maps Street View

Transportation in Fairfax County, Virginia
Virginia Railway Express stations
Railway stations in the United States opened in 1992
1992 establishments in Virginia